Max Chantal (21 August 1958 – 9 January 2023) was a French rugby league player who represented France in the 1977 and 1985–1988 Rugby League World Cups.

Honours
 Team Honours:
 Winner of the European Nations Cup: 1981 (France).
 Winner of the French Championship: 1980 (Villeneuve-sur-Lot).
Winner of the Lord Derby Cup: 1979 and 1984 (Villeneuve-sur-Lot).
 Runner-up at the French Championship: 1974, 1981, 1983 and 1984 (Villeneuve-sur-Lot).

Personal life
His son, Benoît Chantal was also a rugby league player for Villeneuve-sur-Lot.

References

1958 births
2023 deaths
French rugby league players
French rugby league coaches
France national rugby league team captains
France national rugby league team players
Rugby league second-rows
Rugby league props
Villeneuve Leopards players
People from Villeneuve-sur-Lot
Sportspeople from Lot-et-Garonne